Cadotte Lake is an unincorporated community in northern Alberta, Canada within Northern Sunrise County.

The community straddles the boundary between the Woodland Cree First Nation Reserve 226 and Northern Sunrise County. The western portion of the community, located within the reserve, is known as the Cadotte Lake Indian Settlement, while the eastern portion, located within Northern Sunrise County, is designated a hamlet.

The community is named for the nearby lake, as is the out-flowing Cadotte River, which lends its name to the Cadotte Member of the Peace River Formation, a stratigraphical unit of the Western Canadian Sedimentary Basin.

Demographics 

See also 
List of communities in Alberta
List of designated places in Alberta
List of hamlets in Alberta

References 

 The Boiling Point (Curtis Haugan. Record-Gazette. September 2, 2008)

Hamlets in Alberta
Communities on Indian reserves in Alberta
Designated places in Alberta
Northern Sunrise County